Hypotelorism is an abnormally decreased distance between two organs or bodily parts, usually pertaining to the eye sockets (orbits), also known as orbital hypotelorism.

Causes
It is often a result of fetal alcohol syndrome (FAS), caused by large alcohol intake in the first month of pregnancy.

It can be associated with trisomy 13, which is also known as Patau syndrome, as well as hereditary neuralgic amyotrophy. 

It can also be associated with fragile X syndrome and Prader–Willi syndrome.

Metopic synostosis, the early closure of metopic suture during skull development in children, can also cause hypotelorism.

See also
 Hypertelorism

References

External links 

Eye diseases